Satara aequata is a species of moth in the family Erebidae first described by Francis Walker in 1865. It is found in western Sulawesi.

References

Moths described in 1865
Spilosomina